Papaver dubium is a species of poppy known by the common names long-headed poppy and blindeyes. It is an annual species which prefers sandy soils without lime. It is widespread throughout its native Europe and as an introduction in America and elsewhere.

Description
Papaver dubium is a variable annual, growing to about 60 cm in height. It generally flowers in late spring to mid-summer. The flower is large (30-70mm) and showy, with four petals that are lighter red than in the similar Papaver rhoeas, and most commonly without a black spot at the base.  The flower stem is usually covered with coarse hairs that are closely appressed to the surface, helping to distinguish it from P. rhoeas in which the hairs are more usually patent, held at right angles to the stem. The capsules are hairless, elongated to more than twice as tall as they are wide, tapering slightly at the tip, with a stigma generally less wide than the capsule. The plant exudes white to yellowish latex when the tissues are broken. The species can form a long-lived soil seed bank that can germinate when the soil is disturbed.

A nearly black-flowering hybrid, known as Evelina, was bred in Italy in the late 1990s, with Papaver rhoeas, but does not appear to be available commercially.

Gallery

References

External links

Mohn.tk (German)

dubium
Plants described in 1753
Taxa named by Carl Linnaeus